Old Burying Ground may refer to:

in Canada
 Old Burying Ground (Halifax, Nova Scotia)

in the United States
(by state)
Old Burying Ground (Brookline, Massachusetts)
Old Burying Ground (Cambridge, Massachusetts)
Old Burying Ground, Duxbury, Massachusetts
Old Burying Ground (Littleton, Massachusetts), listed on the NRHP in Massachusetts
Old Burying Ground (Stoneham, Massachusetts), listed on the NRHP in Massachusetts
Old Scots Burying Ground, Marlboro, New Jersey listed on the NRHP in New Jersey
Old Burying Ground (Beaufort, North Carolina), listed on the NRHP in North Carolina
Old Colony Burying Ground, Granville, OH, listed on the NRHP in Ohio